Joseph Arshad (born August 25, 1964) is the Roman Catholic Bishop of Islamabad-Rawalpindi in Pakistan.

Biography
Arshad was born on August 25, 1964 in Lahore. After completing school, he began his priestly education at St. Mary's Minor Seminary, Lahore. He continued his studies at Christ the King Seminary in Karachi. After his ordination on November 1, 1991, he was appointed Parochial Vicar of St. Joseph's Church and also given charge of St. Peter's School in Gujranwala. For a while he also studied journalism.

In 1995, he went to Rome for Canon Law studies at the Pontifical Urban University and then underwent training as a Vatican diplomat at the Pontifical Ecclesiastical Academy.

His doctoral dissertation “The responsibility of a diocesan bishop in defending the unity of the universal Church according to c. 392” was published by the Urbaniana University Press in 1999.

He was the first Pakistani priest to join the Vatican diplomatic service. From 1999 to 2002 he served at the Apostolic Nunciature in Malta. From then until 2010, he served at the Apostolic Nunciatures in Sri Lanka, Bangladesh, and Madagascar.

As of July 2013 he was a councillor at the Apostolic Nunciature in Bosnia and Herzegovina.

Pope Francis on July 3, 2013 appointed Arshad as the bishop of the Faisalabad Diocese. The Diocese has an area of 35,300m and a population of 38,265,000, of whom 150,000 are Catholics with 42 priests.

After being ordained as bishop of Faisalabad on November 1, Arshad celebrated his first mass in St. Joseph's Church, Lahore on 3 November 2013. He completed his schooling from
St Joseph’s High School in the Parish.

Arshad, head of the Commission for Social Communications, attended the 15th Conference of Radio Veritas Asia listeners held on 21 September 2015 at Loyola Hall in Lahore. He invited the participants to build peace, tolerance and brotherhood in society via the radio.

On 12 November 2016, Arshad was appointed  as the Apostolic Administrator of the Diocese of  Islamabad-Rawalpindi, which was vacant since the death of Bishop Rufin Anthony, who died on October 17, 2016.

On December 10, 2016,  he received the National Human Rights Award 2016 from Pakistan President Mamnoon Hussain for human rights advocacy. Arshad is also the chair of the Catholic Bishop’s National Commission for Justice and Peace.

On 10 November 2017 he became president of the Catholic Bishops' Conference of Pakistan.

On 8 December 2017 Pope Francis transferred Arshad as the bishop of the Islamabad-Rawalpindi diocese in Pakistan. He also conferred on him the “personal title” of archbishop.

In July 2019, Arshad inaugurated a six-month preparatory course designed to help young men and women prepare for the Central Superior Services exam conducted annually to recruit people for top public service positions.

References

External links section

1964 births
Living people
21st-century Roman Catholic bishops in Pakistan
People from Lahore
Roman Catholic bishops of Islamabad-Rawalpindi
Roman Catholic bishops of Faisalabad